Brhlovce is a municipality and village in the Levice District in the south-west of Slovakia, in the Nitra Region.

It was formed in 1952 by a merger of the villages Dolné Brhlovce and Horné Brhlovce.

It lies some 10 km east of Levice. It is known mainly for its troglodyte-like excavated dwellings, cut into the volcanic sub-layer, that have been proposed for the UNESCO World Heritage List.

The excavated dwellings are said to have been constructed by the local people in the 16th and 17th centuries in order to "hide the village" and avoid the Turkish raids. They did not want to build normal ground-level houses because these would be visible from afar.

Brhlovce has a population of 329 people and an area of 13.385 km².

See also
 List of municipalities and towns in Slovakia

References

Genealogical resources

The records for genealogical research are available at the state archive "Statny Archiv in Nitra, Presov, Slovakia"

 Roman Catholic church records (births/marriages/deaths): 1844-1895 (parish B)
 Lutheran church records (births/marriages/deaths): 1746-1896 (parish B)

External links
 Official website
 Spectacular Slovakia article about Brhlovce

Surnames of living people in Brhlovce

Villages and municipalities in Levice District